Social psychology is a subfield of psychology, studying the mentality of the individual in a group. 

Social psychology may also refer to:

 Social psychology (sociology), a subfield of sociology, studying the behavior of individuals in groups
 Social Psychology (journal), a peer-reviewed academic journal
 "Social Psychology" (Community), a television episode
 Group dynamics, a field studying the behavior of groups

See also
Journal of Personality and Social Psychology
Psychosociology
Societal psychology